As of September 2016, the International Union for Conservation of Nature (IUCN) lists 9131 least concern fish species. 60% of all evaluated fish species are listed as least concern. 
The IUCN also lists 37 fish subspecies as least concern.

Of the subpopulations of fishes evaluated by the IUCN, 44 species subpopulations have been assessed as least concern.

This is a complete list of least concern fish species and subspecies evaluated by the IUCN. Species and subspecies which have least concern subpopulations (or stocks) are indicated.

Lobe-finned fishes
 South American lungfish (Lepidosiren paradoxa)
 Gilled African lungfish (Protopterus amphibius)
 West African lungfish (Protopterus annectens)
 Spotted African lungfish (Protopterus dolloi)

Cartilaginous fishes
Chondrichthyes includes sharks, rays, skates, and sawfish. There are 313 species and two subpopulations of cartilaginous fish assessed as least concern.

Rays and skates
There are 148 species in the order Rajiformes assessed as least concern.

Guitarfish species
 Eastern shovelnose ray (Aptychotrema rostrata)
 Southern shovelnose ray (Aptychotrema vincentiana)
 Lesser guitarfish (Rhinobatos annulatus)
 Bluntnose guitarfish (Rhinobatos blochii)
 Goldeneye shovelnose ray (Rhinobatos sainsburyi)
 Southern fiddler ray (Trygonorrhina dumerilli)
 Eastern fiddler ray (Trygonorrhina fasciata)

Whiptail stingrays
 Short-tail stingray (Dasyatis brevicaudata)
 Roughtail stingray (Dasyatis centroura)
 Blue stingray (Dasyatis chrysonota)
 Broad stingray (Dasyatis lata)
 Atlantic stingray (Dasyatis sabina)
 Bluntnose stingray (Dasyatis say)
 Thorntail stingray (Dasyatis thetidis)
 Black-spotted whipray (Himantura astra)
 Freshwater whipray (Himantura dalyensis)
 Brown whipray (Himantura toshi)
 Painted maskray (Neotrygon leylandi)
 Peppered maskray (Neotrygon picta)
 Banana-tail ray (Pastinachus ater)
 Pelagic stingray (Pteroplatytrygon violacea)

Narcinids
 Blind torpedo (Benthobatis marcida)
 Western numbfish (Narcine lasti)
 Eastern numbfish (Narcine nelsoni)
 Ornate numbfish (Narcine ornata)
 Tasmanian numbfish (Narcine tasmaniensis)
 Banded numbfish (Narcine westraliensis)

Skates
 Broad skate (Amblyraja badia)
 Southern thorny skate (Amblyraja doellojuradoi)
 Arctic skate (Amblyraja hyperborea)
 Jensen's skate (Amblyraja jenseni)
 Bigmouth skate (Amblyraja robertsi)
 Big skate (Beringraja binoculata)
 Lempriere's skate (Dentiraja lemprieri)
 Brown bight skate (Dipturus acrobelus)
 Pale tropical skate (Dipturus apricus)
 Graham's skate (Dipturus grahami)
 Heald's skate (Dipturus healdi)
 Dipturus oculus
 Argus skate (Dipturus polyommata)
 Slimeskate (Dipturus pullopunctatus)
 Weng's skate (Dipturus wengi)
 Dusky finless skate (Gurgesiella furvescens)
 Rosette skate (Leucoraja garmani)
 Cuckoo skate (Leucoraja naevus)
 Sawback skate (Leucoraja pristispina)
 Yellospotted skate (Leucoraja wallacei)
 Krefft's skate (Malacoraja kreffti)
 Soft skate (Malacoraja spinacidermis)
 Blue pygmy skate (Neoraja caerulea)
 Iberian pygmy skate (Neoraja iberica)
 Arafura skate (Okamejei arafurensis)
 Okamejei leptoura
 Clearnose skate (Raja eglanteria)
 California skate (Raja inornata)
 Brown skate (Raja miraletus)
 Spotted skate (Raja montagui)
 Speckled ray (Raja polystigma)
 Raja rhina
 Pacific starry skate (Raja stellulata)
 Bigthorn skate (Rajella barnardi)
 Rajella bathyphila
 Bigelow's skate (Rajella bigelowi)
 Challenger skate (Rajella challengeri)
 Ghost skate (Rajella dissimilis)
 Sooty skate (Rajella fuliginea)
 Round ray (Rajella fyllae)
 Mid-atlantic skate (Rajella kukujevi)
 Leopard skate (Rajella leopardus)
 Sailray (Rajella lintea)
 Blackish skate (Rajella nigerrima)
 Purplebelly skate (Rajella purpuriventralis)
 Smoothback skate (Rajella ravidula)
 New Zealand rough skate (Zearaja nasutus)

Urolophids
 Western shovelnose stingaree (Trygonoptera mucosa)
 Striped stingaree (Trygonoptera ovalis)
 Masked stingaree (Trygonoptera personata)
 Common stingaree (Trygonoptera testacea)
 Circular stingaree (Urolophus circularis)
 Crossback stingaree (Urolophus cruciatus)
 Chesterfield Island stingaree (Urolophus deforgesi)
 Wide stingaree (Urolophus expansus)
 Patchwork stingaree (Urolophus flavomosaicus)
 Spotted stingaree (Urolophus gigas)
 Lobed stingaree (Urolophus lobatus)
 Mitotic stingaree (Urolophus mitosis)
 New Caledonian stingaree (Urolophus neocaledoniensis)
 Butterfly stingaree (Urolophus papilio)
 Sparsely-spotted stingaree (Urolophus paucimaculatus)
 Coral Sea stingaree (Urolophus piperatus)
 Brown stingaree (Urolophus westraliensis)

Skates
 Aleutian skate (Bathyraja aleutica)
 Little-eyed skate (Bathyraja andriashevi)
 Bottom skate (Bathyraja bergi)
 Broadnose skate (Bathyraja brachyurops)
 Duskypink skate (Bathyraja diplotaenia)
 Cinnamon skate (Bathyraja fedorovi)
 Bering skate (Bathyraja interrupta)
 Challenger's skate (Bathyraja isotrachys)
 Commander skate (Bathyraja lindbergi)
 White-blotched skate (Bathyraja maculata)
 Bathyraja mariposa
 Fine-spined skate (Bathyraja microtrachys)
 Whitebrow skate (Bathyraja minispinosa)
 Pallid skate (Bathyraja pallida)
 Bathyraja panthera
 Alaska skate (Bathyraja parmifera)
 Richardson's ray (Bathyraja richardsoni)
 Golden skate (Bathyraja smirnovi)
 Pacific white skate (Bathyraja spinosissima)
 Eremo skate (Bathyraja trachouros)
 Roughtail skate (Bathyraja trachura)
 Creamback skate (Bathyraja tzinovskii)
 Western looseskin skate (Insentiraja subtilispinosa)
 Southern round skate (Irolita waitii)
 Notoraja azurea
 Broken Ridge skate (Notoraja lira)
 Blotched skate (Notoraja sticta)
 Allens skate (Pavoraja alleni)
 Mosaic skate (Pavoraja mosaica)
 Peacock skate (Pavoraja nitida)
 False peacock skate (Pavoraja pseudonitida)
 Dusky skate (Pavoraja umbrosa)
 Blotched sandskate (Psammobatis bergi)
 Zipper sandskate (Psammobatis extenta)
 Dapplebellied softnose skate (Rhinoraja kujiensis)
 Rhinoraja longicauda
 Oda skate (Rhinoraja odai)
 Rhinoraja taranetzi

Other Rajiformes species
 Blue-banded eagle ray (Aetomylaeus caeruleofasciatus)
 Australian butterfly ray (Gymnura australis)
 California butterfly ray (Gymnura marmorata)
 Sixgill stingray (Hexatrygon bickelli)
 Coffin ray (Hypnos monopterygius)
 Bat ray (Myliobatis californicus)
 New Zealand eagle ray (Myliobatis tenuicaudatus)
 Thornback guitarfish (Platyrhinoidis triseriata)
 Deepwater stingray (Plesiobatis daviesi)
 Bigtooth river stingray (Potamotrygon henlei)
 Magdalena freshwater stingray (Potamotrygon magdalenae)
 Potamotrygon orbignyi
 Borneo legskate (Sinobatis borneensis)
 Western legskate (Sinobatis bulbicauda)
 Blackbodied legskate (Sinobatis melanosoma)
 Pacific electric ray (Tetronarce californica)
 Round stingray (Urobatis halleri)
 Yellow stingray (Urobatis jamaicensis)
 Smalleyed round stingray (Urotrygon microphthalmum)

Ground sharks
There are 79 ground shark species assessed as least concern.

Requiem sharks
 Creek whaler (Carcharhinus fitzroyensis)
 Finetooth shark (Carcharhinus isodon)
 Australian blacktip shark (Carcharhinus tilstoni)
 Sliteye shark (Loxodon macrorhinus)
 Caribbean sharpnose shark (Rhizoprionodon porosus)
 Australian sharpnose shark (Rhizoprionodon taylori)
 Atlantic sharpnose shark (Rhizoprionodon terraenovae)

Houndsharks
 Whiskery shark (Furgaleus macki)
 Sicklefin houndshark (Hemitriakis falcata)
 Japanese topeshark (Hemitriakis japanica)
 Blacktip tope (Hypogaleus hyugaensis)
 Longnose houndshark (Iago garricki)
 Bigeye houndshark (Iago omanensis)
 Gummy shark (Mustelus antarcticus)
 Starry smooth-hound (Mustelus asterias)
 Grey smooth-hound (Mustelus californicus)
 Brown smooth-hound (Mustelus henlei)
 Smalleye smooth-hound (Mustelus higmani)
 Spotted estuary smooth-hound (Mustelus lenticulatus)
 Sicklefin smooth-hound (Mustelus lunulatus)
 Australian grey smooth-hound (Mustelus ravidus)
 Western spotted gummy shark (Mustelus stevensi)
 Banded houndshark (Triakis scyllium)
 Leopard shark (Triakis semifasciata)

Catsharks
 White-bodied catshark (Apristurus albisoma)
 Roughskin catshark (Apristurus ampliceps)
 White ghost catshark (Apristurus aphyodes)
 Pinocchio catshark (Apristurus australis)
 Flaccid catshark (Apristurus exsanguis)
 Longhead catshark (Apristurus longicephalus)
 Ghost catshark (Apristurus manis)
 Black roughscale catshark (Apristurus melanoasper)
 Smalleye catshark (Apristurus microps)
 Fat catshark (Apristurus pinguis)
 Spatulasnout catshark (Apristurus platyrhynchus)
 Saldanha catshark (Apristurus saldanha)
 Australian spotted catshark (Asymbolus analis)
 Starry catshark (Asymbolus galacticus)
 Western spotted catshark (Asymbolus occiduus)
 Pale spotted catshark (Asymbolus pallidus)
 Asymbolus parvus
 Orange-spotted catshark (Asymbolus rubiginosus)
 Variegated catshark (Asymbolus submaculatus)
 Gulf catshark (Asymbolus vincenti)
 Banded sand catshark (Atelomycterus fasciatus)
 Australian marbled catshark (Atelomycterus macleayi)
 Australian blackspotted catshark (Aulohalaelurus labiosus)
 Australian reticulate swellshark (Cephaloscyllium hiscosellum)
 Draughtsboard shark (Cephaloscyllium isabellum)
 Australian swellshark (Cephaloscyllium laticeps)
 Balloon shark (Cephaloscyllium sufflans)
 Swellshark (Cephaloscyllium ventriosum)
 Australian sawtail catshark (Figaro boardmani)
 Roughtail catshark (Galeus arae)
 Gecko catshark (Galeus eastmani)
 Blackmouth catshark (Galeus melastomus)
 Mouse catshark (Galeus murinus)
 Peppered catshark (Galeus piperatus)
 African sawtail catshark (Galeus polli)
 Phallic catshark (Galeus priapus)
 Indonesian speckled catshark (Halaelurus maculosus)
 Rusty catshark (Halaelurus sellus)
 Dark shyshark (Haploblepharus pictus)
 Izak catshark (Holohalaelurus regani)
 Filetail catshark (Parmaturus xaniurus)
 Narrowtail catshark (Schroederichthys maculatus)
 Boa catshark (Scyliorhinus boa)
 Small-spotted catshark (Scyliorhinus canicula)
 Chain catshark (Scyliorhinus retifer)
 Cloudy catshark (Scyliorhinus torazame)
 Dwarf catshark (Scyliorhinus torrei)

Other ground shark species
 Pygmy ribbontail catshark (Eridacnis radcliffei)
 African ribbontail catshark (Eridacnis sinuans)
 Slender smooth-hound (Gollum attenuatus)
 Australian weasel shark (Hemigaleus australiensis)
 False catshark (Pseudotriakis microdon)

Carpet sharks
 Blind shark (Brachaelurus waddi)
 Tasselled wobbegong (Eucrossorhinus dasypogon)
 Epaulette shark (Hemiscyllium ocellatum)
 Speckled carpetshark (Hemiscyllium trispeculare)
 Floral banded wobbegong (Orectolobus floridus)
 Gulf wobbegong (Orectolobus halei)
 Western wobbegong (Orectolobus hutchinsi)
 Spotted wobbegong (Orectolobus maculatus)
 Ornate wobbegong (Orectolobus ornatus)
 Dwarf spotted wobbegong (Orectolobus parvimaculatus)
 Northern wobbegong (Orectolobus wardi)
 Collared carpetshark (Parascyllium collare)
 Rusty carpetshark (Parascyllium ferrugineum)
 Necklace carpetshark (Parascyllium variolatum)
 Cobbler wobbegong (Sutorectus tentaculatus)

Squaliformes
There are 34 species and two subpopulations in the order Squaliformes assessed as least concern.

Centrophorids
Species
Birdbeak dogfish (Deania calcea)
Arrowhead dogfish (Deania profundorum)
Subpopulations
Smallfin gulper shark (Centrophorus moluccensis) (1 subpopulation)

Squalids
Species
 Northern spiny dogfish (Squalus griffini)
 Blacktailed spurdog (Squalus melanurus)
 Kermadec spiny dogfish (Squalus raoulensis)
 North Pacific spiny dogfish (Squalus suckleyi)
Subpopulations
Spiny dogfish (Squalus acanthias) (2 subpopulations)

Somniosids
Roughskin dogfish (Centroscymnus owstonii)
Longnose velvet dogfish (Centroselachus crepidater)

Dalatiids
 Pygmy shark (Euprotomicrus bispinatus)
 Longnose pygmy shark (Heteroscymnoides marleyi)
 Cookiecutter shark (Isistius brasiliensis)
 Largetooth cookiecutter shark (Isistius plutodus)
 Smalleye pygmy shark (Squaliolus aliae)
 Spined pygmy shark (Squaliolus laticaudus)

Etmopterids
 Black dogfish (Centroscyllium fabricii)
 New Zealand lanternshark (Etmopterus baxteri)
 Blurred lanternshark (Etmopterus bigelowi)
 Tailspot lanternshark (Etmopterus caudistigmus)
 Pink lanternshark (Etmopterus dianthus)
 Etmopterus dislineatus
 Blackmouth lanternshark (Etmopterus evansi)
 Pygmy lanternshark (Etmopterus fusus)
 Broadbanded lanternshark (Etmopterus gracilispinis)
 Southern lanternshark (Etmopterus granulosus)
 Caribbean lanternshark (Etmopterus hillianus)
 Blackbelly lanternshark (Etmopterus lucifer)
 False lanternshark (Etmopterus pseudosqualiolus)
 Smooth lanternshark (Etmopterus pusillus)
 West Indian lanternshark (Etmopterus robinsi)
 Fringefin lanternshark (Etmopterus schultzi)
 Thorny lanternshark (Etmopterus sentosus)
 Velvet belly lanternshark (Etmopterus spinax)
 Hawaiian lanternshark (Etmopterus villosus)
 Green lanternshark (Etmopterus virens)

Chimaeras
There are 23 Chimaera species assessed as least concern.

Chimaerids
 Whitefin chimaera (Chimaera argiloba)
 Southern chimaera (Chimaera fulva)
 Carpenter's chimaera (Chimaera lignaria)
 Longspine chimaera (Chimaera macrospina)
 Cape chimaera (Chimaera notafricana)
 Small-eyed rabbitfish (Hydrolagus affinis)
 Pale ghost shark (Hydrolagus bemisi)
 Spotted ratfish (Hydrolagus colliei)
 Black ghostshark (Hydrolagus homonycteris)
 Bight ghostshark (Hydrolagus lemures)
 Hydrolagus lusitanicus
 Marbled ghostshark (Hydrolagus marmoratus)
 Eastern Pacific ghostshark (Hydrolagus melanophasma)
 Dark ghostshark (Hydrolagus novaezealandiae)
 Pale chimaera (Hydrolagus pallidus)
 Pointy-nosed blue chimaera (Hydrolagus trolli)

Callorhinchids
 American elephantfish (Callorhinchus callorynchus)
 Cape elephantfish (Callorhinchus capensis)
 Australian ghostshark (Callorhinchus milii)

Rhinochimaerids

 Smallspine spookfish (Harriotta haeckeli)
 Narrownose chimaera (Harriotta raleighana)
 Broadnose chimaera (Rhinochimaera atlantica)
 Pacific spookfish (Rhinochimaera pacifica)

Other cartilaginous fish species

 Frilled shark (Chlamydoselachus anguineus)
 Crested bullhead shark (Heterodontus galeatus)
 Japanese bullhead shark (Heterodontus japonicus)
 Port Jackson shark (Heterodontus portusjacksoni)
 Zebra bullhead shark (Heterodontus zebra)
 Salmon shark (Lamna ditropis)
 Bigeye sand tiger shark (Odontaspis noronhai)
 Megamouth shark (Megachasma pelagios)
 Goblin shark (Mitsukurina owstoni)
 Longnose sawshark (Pristiophorus cirratus)
 Tropical sawshark (Pristiophorus delicatus)
 Shortnose sawshark (Pristiophorus nudipinnis)
 Australian angelshark (Squatina australis)
 Western angelshark (Squatina pseudocellata)
 Ornate angelshark (Squatina tergocellata)

Lampreys

Ray-finned fishes
There are 8759 species, 34 subspecies, and one subpopulation of ray-finned fish assessed as least concern.

Salmoniformes

Species

Subpopulations
Sockeye salmon (Oncorhynchus nerka) (41 subpopulations)

Silversides
There are 47 silverside species assessed as least concern.

Atherinidae

Melanotaeniidae

Neotropical silversides

Other silverside species

Toothcarps
There are 206 species and two subspecies of toothcarp assessed as least concern.

Goodeids
Green goodea (Goodea atripinnis)
Lennon's ilyodon (Ilyodon lennoni)

Pupfish species

Aplocheilids

Rivulids

Nothobranchiids

Species

Subspecies
Aphyosemion cameronense halleri
Dusky panchax (Epiplatys chevalieri nigricans)

Poeciliids

Fundulids

Cypriniformes
Cypriniformes includes carps, minnows, loaches and relatives. There are 1231 species and three subspecies in the order Cypriniformes assessed as least concern.

Hillstream loaches

True loaches

Cyprinids

Species

Subspecies

Psilorhynchids

Suckers

Gyrinocheilids
Honey sucker (Gyrinocheilus aymonieri)
Spotted algae eater (Gyrinocheilus pennocki)

Vaillantellids
Vaillantella maassi

Gasterosteiformes

Osmeriformes
Osmeriformes includes freshwater smelts and allies. There are 90 species in the order Osmeriformes assessed as least concern.

Galaxiids

Smelts

Alepocephalids

Argentinidae

Platytroctids

Deep-sea smelts

Barreleyes

Microstomatids

Other Osmeriformes species

Percopsiformes

Catfishes
There are 707 catfish species assessed as least concern.

Ictalurids

Pangasiidae

Heptapterids

Astroblepids

Sisorids

Silurids

Trichomycterids

Loach catfishes

Claroteids

Airbreathing catfishes

Loricariids

Mochokids

Electric catfish species

Ariids

Bagrids

Schilbeids

Callichthyids

Doradids

Driftwood catfishes

Erethistids

Pseudopimelodids

Other catfish species

Gonorynchiformes

Batrachoidiformes

Perciformes

There are 3878 species and 18 subspecies in the order Perciformes assessed as least concern.

Beloniformes
There are 74 species and seven subspecies in the order Beloniformes assessed as least concern.

Ricefishes

Halfbeaks

Needlefishes

Species

Subspecies

Flying fish

Species

Subspecies
California flying fish (Cheilopogon pinnatibarbatus californicus)

Scomberesocids
Atlantic saury (Scomberesox saurus)
Dwarf Atlantic saury (Scomberesox simulans)

Snakeheads
Northern snakehead (Channa argus)
Small snakehead (Channa asiatica)
Forest snakehead (Channa lucius)
Blotched snakehead (Channa maculata)
Black snakehead (Channa melasoma)
Giant snakehead (Channa micropeltes)
Spotted snakehead (Channa punctata)
Striped snakehead (Channa striata)

Synbranchiformes
There are 52 species in the order Synbranchiformes assessed as least concern.

Swamp eels

Mastacembelids

Gymnotiformes

Osteoglossiformes
There are 127 species in the order Osteoglossiformes assessed as least concern.

Mormyrids

Notopterids

Other Osteoglossiformes species

Gobiesociformes

Characiformes
There are 354 species in the order Characiformes assessed as least concern.

Bryconids

Curimatids

Alestids

Lebiasinids

Distichodontids

Characids

Citharinids

Anostomids

Crenuchids

Other Characiformes species

Syngnathiformes
Syngnathiformes includes the pipefishes and seahorses. There are 102 species and one subspecies in the order Syngnathiformes assessed as least concern.

Syngnathids

Species

Subspecies
Black-sided pipefish (Doryrhamphus excisus excisus)

Centriscids

Aulostomids

Cornetfishes

Clupeiformes
There are 143 species and one subspecies in the order Clupeiformes assessed as least concern.

Clupeids

Species

Subspecies
Peruvian Pacific sardine (Sardinops sagax sagax)

Pristigasterids

Anchovies

Sundasalangids
Mekong noodlefish (Sundasalanx mekongensis)
Dwarf noodlefish (Sundasalanx praecox)

Scorpaeniformes
There are 175 species in the order Scorpaeniformes assessed as least concern.

Cottids

Scorpaenids

Triglids

Other Scorpaeniformes species

Esociformes

Ophidiiformes
There are 123 species in the order Ophidiiformes assessed as least concern.

Brotulas

Ophidiidae

Aphyonids
Gelatinous blindfish (Aphyonus gelatinosus)

Pearlfishes

Parabrotulids
Parabrotula plagiophthalma

Tetraodontiformes
There are 208 species and two subspecies in the order Tetraodontiformes assessed as least concern.

Molids
Sharptail mola (Masturus lanceolatus)
Slender sunfish (Ranzania laevis)

Triggerfishes

Tetraodontids

Filefish species

Ostraciids

Porcupinefish

Species

Subspecies
Guinean burrfish (Chilomycterus spinosus mauretanicus)
Brown burrfish (Chilomycterus spinosus spinosus)

Aracanids
Chubby basketfish (Anoplocapros inermis)

Spikefishes

Gadiformes
There are 91 species in the order Gadiformes assessed as least concern.

Gadids

Merlucciids

Grenadiers species

Morids

Codlets

Lotids

Melanonids
Arrowtail (Melanonus zugmayeri)

Phycids

Mullets

Bichirs

Eels
There are 229 eel species assessed as least concern.

Chlopsids

Ophichthids

Congrids

Moray eels

Cutthroat eels

Nettastomatids

Heterenchelyids

Other eel species

Flatfishes
There are 167 flatfish species assessed as least concern.

Pleuronectids

Soleids

Tonguefishes

Paralichthyids

American soles

Bothids

Citharids
Yellow-dappled flounder (Brachypleura novaezeelandiae)
Atlantic spotted flounder (Citharus linguatula)

Scophthalmids
Norwegian topknot (Phrynorhombus norvegicus)

Anglerfishes
There are 87 anglerfish species assessed as least concern.

Goosefish species

Frogfishes

Oneirodids

Ogcocephalids

Whipnose anglers

Leftvents

Other anglerfish species

Beryciformes
There are 71 species in the order Beryciformes assessed as least concern.

Holocentrids

Other Beryciformes species

Stephanoberyciformes

Aulopiformes
There are 81 species in the order Aulopiformes assessed as least concern.

Notosudids

Barracudinas

Ipnopids

Pearleyes

Synodontids

Other Aulopiformes species

Notacanthiformes

Zeiformes

Stomiiformes
There are 141 species in the order Stomiiformes assessed as least concern.

Sternoptychids

Stomiids

Gonostomatids

Phosichthyids

Cetomimiformes

Myctophiformes
There are 98 species in the order Myctophiformes assessed as least concern.

Lanternfishes

 Glacier lantern fish (Benthosema glaciale)
 Skinnycheek lanternfish (Benthosema pterotum)
 Benthosema suborbitale
 Bolinichthys distofax
 Smoothcheek lanternfish (Bolinichthys indicus)
 Spurcheek lanternfish (Bolinichthys photothorax)
 Stubby lanternfish (Bolinichthys supralateralis)
 Centrobranchus nigroocellatus
 Madeira lantern fish (Ceratoscopelus maderensis)
 Warming's lantern fish (Ceratoscopelus warmingii)
 Andersen's lanternfish (Diaphus anderseni)
 Bertelsen's lanternfish (Diaphus bertelseni)
 Diaphus brachycephalus
 Crown lanternfish (Diaphus diadematus)
 Diaphus effulgens
 Diaphus fragilis
 Garman's lanternfish (Diaphus garmani)
 Small lantern fish (Diaphus holti)
 Diaphus hudsoni
 Diaphus lucidus
 Lutkens lanternfish (Diaphus luetkeni)
 Diaphus meadi
 Spothead lantern fish (Diaphus metopoclampus)
 Soft lanternfish (Diaphus mollis)
 Diaphus ostenfeldi
 Diaphus perspicillatus
 Problematic lanternfish (Diaphus problematicus)
 White-spotted lantern fish (Diaphus rafinesquii)
 Diaphus splendidus
 Diaphus termophilus
 Vanhoffen's lanternfish (Diaphus vanhoeffeni)
 Longfin lanternfish (Diogenichthys atlanticus)
 Electric lantern fish (Electrona risso)
 Gonichthys cocco
 Benoit's lanternfish (Hygophum benoiti)
 Bermuda lantern fish (Hygophum hygomii)
 Hygophum macrochir
 Firefly lanternfish (Hygophum proximum)
 Hygophum reinhardtii
 Hygophum taaningi
 Krefftichthys anderssoni
 Lampadena chavesi
 Lampadena luminosa
 Jordans lanternfish (Lampadena pontifex)
 Mirror lanternfish (Lampadena speculigera)
 Hector's lanternfish (Lampanyctodes hectoris)
 Lampanyctus alatus
 Southern lanternfish (Lampanyctus australis)
 Jewel lanternfish (Lampanyctus crocodilus)
 Lampanyctus festivus
 Diamondcheek lanternfish (Lampanyctus intricarius)
 Brokenline lanternfish (Lampanyctus jordani)
 Rakery beaconlamp (Lampanyctus macdonaldi)
 Noble lanternfish (Lampanyctus nobilis)
 Dotback lanternfish (Lampanyctus photonotus)
 Pygmy lanternfish (Lampanyctus pusillus)
 Lampanyctus tenuiformis
 Nacreous lanternfish (Lampanyctus vadulus)
 Lampichthys procerus
 Lepidophanes gaussi
 Lepidophanes guentheri
 Dofleini's lantern fish (Lobianchia dofleini)
 Gemellar's lanternfish (Lobianchia gemellarii)
 Barebelly lanternfish (Loweina interrupta)
 Rare lanternfish (Loweina rara)
 Myctophum affine
 Myctophum asperum
 Nightlight lanternfish (Myctophum lychnobium)
 Myctophum nitidulum
 Myctophum obtusirostre
 Myctophum phengodes
 Myctophum punctatum
 Myctophum selenops
 Spinose lanternfish (Myctophum spinosum)
 Dusky lanternfish (Nannobrachium atrum)
 Nannobrachium cuprarium
 Gibbs lanternfish (Nannobrachium gibbsi)
 Nannobrachium isaacsi
 Nannobrachium lineatum
 Wisner's lanternfish (Nannobrachium wisneri)
 Topside lampfish (Notolychnus valdiviae)
 Notoscopelus bolini
 Notoscopelus caudispinosus
 Notoscopelus elongatus
 Patchwork lampfish (Notoscopelus resplendens)
 Protomyctophum luciferum
 Scopelopsis multipunctatus
 Symbolophorus barnardi
 Symbolophorus boops
 Krefft's lanternfish (Symbolophorus kreffti)
 Rufous lanternfish (Symbolophorus rufinus)
 Large-scale lantern fish (Symbolophorus veranyi)
 Deepwater lanternfish (Taaningichthys bathyphilus)
 Taaningichthys minimus
 Taaningichthys paurolychnus

Neoscopelids

 Largescaled neoscopelid (Neoscopelus macrolepidotus)
 Sombre blackchin (Scopelengys tristis)
 Solivomer arenidens

Lampriformes

 Polka-dot ribbonfish (Desmodema polystictum)
 Unicorn crestfish (Eumecichthys fiski)
 Opah (Lampris guttatus)
 Crested oarfish (Lophotus lacepede)
 Tapertail (Radiicephalus elongatus)
 Giant oarfish (Regalecus glesne)
 Regalecus russelii
 Mediterranean dealfish (Trachipterus trachypterus)
 Scalloped ribbonfish (Zu cristatus)
 Scalloped dealfish (Zu elongatus)

Stylephoriformes 

 Tube-eye (Stylephorus chordatus)

Other ray-finned fish species

 Lake sturgeon (Acipenser fulvescens)
 White sturgeon (Acipenser transmontanus)
 Eastern Pacific bonefish (Albula esuncula)
 Bowfin (Amia calva)
 Pacific jellynose fish (Ateleopus japonicus)
 Bobtail eel (Cyema atrum)
 West African ladyfish (Elops lacerta)
 Elops machnata
 Northern ladyfish (Elops saurus)
 Pelican eel (Eurypharynx pelecanoides)
 Jellynose (Guentherus altivela)
 Loppe's tadpole fish (Ijimaia loppei)
 Longnose gar (Lepisosteus osseus)
 Shortnose gar (Lepisosteus platostomus)
 Florida gar (Lepisosteus platyrhincus)
 Stout beardfish (Polymixia nobilis)
 Taillight gulper (Saccopharynx ampullaceus)
 Saccopharynx ramosus

Hagfishes

 Eptatretus alastairi
 Eptatretus caribbeaus
 Eptatretus carlhubbsi
 New Zealand hagfish (Eptatretus cirrhatus)
Guadalupe hagfish (Eptatretus fritzi)
 Eptatretus gomoni
 Eptatretus grouseri
 Sixgill hagfish (Eptatretus hexatrema)
 Eptatretus indrambaryai
 Eptatretus laurahubbsae
 Eptatretus mccoskeri
 Eptatretus mendozai
 Eptatretus menezesi
 Eptatretus multidens
 Eptatretus okinoseanus
Fivegill hagfish (Eptatretus profundus)
Cortez hagfish (Eptatretus sinus)
 Strickrott's hagfish (Eptatretus strickrotti)
 Eptatretus wisneri
Patagonian hagfish (Myxine affinis)
 Southern hagfish (Myxine australis)
Cape hagfish (Myxine capensis)
Whiteface hagfish (Myxine circifrons)
 Myxine fernholmi
 Atlantic hagfish (Myxine glutinosa)
 Myxine hubbsi
White-headed hagfish (Myxine ios)
Jespersen's hagfish (Myxine jespersenae)
 Myxine mccoskeri
 Caribbean hagfish (Myxine mcmillanae)
 Myxine robinsorum
 Paramyxine sheni
Gulf hagfish (Paramyxine springeri)
 Paramyxine wisneri
 Paramyxine yangi

See also 
 Lists of IUCN Red List least concern species
 List of near threatened fishes
 List of vulnerable fishes
 List of endangered fishes
 List of critically endangered fishes
 List of recently extinct fishes
 List of data deficient fishes
 Sustainable seafood advisory lists and certification

References 

Fishes
Least concern fishes
Least concern fishes
Least concern fishes